This is a list of episodes for the third season of Nickelodeon's animated television series, Kung Fu Panda: Legends of Awesomeness. Its first episode premiered on June 24, 2013, and its last episode premiered on June 29, 2016, in the United States. Prior to premiering in the United States, the final few episodes of the series were released in chronological order in Germany between December 30, 2014, and January 7, 2015. In the United States, the final few episodes did not premiere in chronological order.

Episodes

DVD releases

Notes

References

2013 American television seasons
2014 American television seasons
2015 American television seasons